Walter Farquharson (26 June 1859 – 21 January 1930) was a Jamaican cricketer. He played in two first-class matches for the Jamaican cricket team in 1894/95.

See also
 List of Jamaican representative cricketers

References

External links
 

1859 births
1930 deaths
Jamaican cricketers
Jamaica cricketers
People from Saint Elizabeth Parish